Jovan Dejanović, known as Jovan Dragaš (Јован Драгаш), was a Serbian nobleman that held the title of despot under the Serbian Emperor Uroš V, his cousin. He later became an Ottoman vassal after the Battle of Maritsa in 1371.

His father, despot Dejan ruled Kumanovo with a district spanning from Preševo to Velbazhd (Kyustendil). After his father's death, the young brothers Jovan and Constantine were taken care of by Vlatko Paskačić, at the order of the Mrnjavčevićs, who continued to rule the region until Jovan reached adolescence.

He began his office in circa 1365, and ruled alongside his mother and younger brother Constantine for some years. His cousin gave him the title of Despot, as had done his father before him (this is attested in sources dating to 1373).

Ottoman sources report that in 1373, the Ottoman army compelled Jovan (who they called Saruyar) in the upper Struma, to recognize Ottoman vassalage.

After the Battle of Maritsa, the two brothers became Ottoman vassals as the Mrnjavčevićs were defeated. They, however, continued to rule their region as a semi-independent state, and managed to further expand their father's district, taking territory from Jovan Oliver. He issued coins that were of same design as those of Vukašin Mrnjavčević.
 
He donated the St. Basil's church in Štip to the Hilandar monastery.

He died in 1378 and his brother continued to rule until 1395.

See also 
 Fall of the Serbian Empire

References

Sources

 
 
 
 
 
 

14th-century Serbian nobility
1343 births
1378 deaths
Despots of the Serbian Empire
Dejanović noble family